Douglas W. Clayton (born September 2, 1960) is an American venture capitalist. He is the founder and CEO of Leopard Capital.

Education and military service
Clayton was awarded a 4-year Army Reserve Officers' Training Corps scholarship to attend Cornell University, where he received a Bachelor of Arts degree in history in 1982 and joined the Beta Theta Pi fraternity. Later he studied at Northwestern University's Kellogg School of Management and received a Master of Management degree from the Sasin Graduate Institute of Business Administration of Chulalongkorn University, Thailand.

Clayton served as a Counterintelligence Platoon leader in the United States Army from 1982 to 1986, including a tour of duty in Seoul, Korea. He completed US Army Intelligence School, counter-terrorism training, airborne parachutist training, and a Korean ranger course, before being honorably discharged with the rank of captain.

Professional career
In 1986, Clayton moved to Hong Kong and joined Sun Hung Kai & Co. as institutional sales manager. Afterward, Clayton worked at Kerry Securities as head of research in Hong Kong and then Bangkok.

Clayton served as CLSA's chief executive in Thailand, and led the office to #1 ranking in the Asiamoney Brokers Poll. He was promoted and transferred to New York to set up and manage CLSA's Latin America division, establishing sales and research offices in Brazil, Mexico, Argentina, Chile and Venezuela. He served as the chief executive officer at CLSA Securities from 1994 to 1997.

Clayton returned to Thailand in 1999 to found Abacus Equity Partners, which advised on several landmark private equity deals in Thailand. He later joined Credit Agricole Indosuez WI Carr Securities, managing its Singapore and Malaysia offices.

Leopard Capital
In 2007, Clayton moved to Phnom Penh, Cambodia and founded Leopard Capital to pioneer investment funds in frontier markets. During the 2008–2009 global financial crisis, Leopard Capital successfully launched Leopard Cambodia Fund as the first private equity fund for Cambodia. The Fund subsequently made 12 investments in Cambodia, Laos, and Thailand and achieved three exits.

In 2012, Leopard Capital raised the first private equity fund for Haiti, initially raising $20 million from The World Bank's International Finance Corp, The Inter-American Development Bank's Multilateral Investment Fund, and the Netherlands Development Finance Company (FMO).

Professional activities
Clayton is a director of Kingdom Breweries (Cambodia) and DloHaiti, trustee of the Centre for Khmer Studies, and served as technical advisor to the director general of the Securities and Exchange Commission of Cambodia.  As a recognized industry expert, Clayton appears frequently on financial industry television programs, including Bloomberg, CNBC, and Reuters. His comments on frontier markets are frequently quoted in the Financial Times, The Wall Street Journal, The New York Times, and numerous other print and electronic publications.

A frequent speaker at investment conferences, Clayton and Leopard Capital were discussed in the book World Right Side Up and were the subject of a case study by the Stanford Graduate School of Business. Clayton serves on the Asia Council of the Emerging Markets Private Equity Association (EMPEA) and was named CEO of the Year – Hong Kong in the 2013 Business Excellence Awards.

References

1960 births
Living people
American investors
American venture capitalists
American financiers
American money managers
American chief executives of financial services companies
American financial analysts
American financial company founders
Businesspeople from Connecticut
People from Madison, Connecticut
Cornell University alumni
Douglas Clayton
Kellogg School of Management alumni